is a railway station in Chūō-ku, Kobe, Japan, operated by West Japan Railway Company (JR West). Although Kobe Station is the namesake of the city of Kobe, Kobe City Hall and the commercial center of Kobe is closer to Kobe-Sannomiya Station.

Lines
The station technically forms the end point of the Tokaido Main Line and the starting of the Sanyo Main Line. This fact is barely discernible in current practice because only a few trains originate or terminate at Kobe; as a result, the station is more commonly perceived as being in the midsection of the JR Kobe Line, an alternative name for the section of the Tokaido and Sanyo lines between Osaka and Himeji.

Layout
The station has one side platform and two island platforms serving five elevated tracks.

Platforms

Adjacent stations

History
Kobe Station opened on 11 May 1874. With the privatization of JNR on 1 April 1987, the station came under the control of JR West.

Station numbering was introduced in March 2018 with Kobe being assigned station number JR-A63.

Surrounding area

The area to the south of the station was previously a freight yard, but was redeveloped and became a waterfront commercial center called Harborland.

Escalators and underground pathways link pedestrian traffic from the above-ground Kobe Station with the relatively close underground stations of Kosoku Kobe on the Kobe Rapid Railway and Harborland on the Kaigan Line of the Kobe Municipal Subway.

See also
 List of railway stations in Japan

References

External links

JR West - Kobe Station 

Tōkaidō Main Line
Sanyō Main Line
Railway stations in Kobe
Stations of West Japan Railway Company
Railway stations in Japan opened in 1874